Iuri Gomes Miguel (born 8 September 1997) is a Portuguese footballer who plays for Cova da Piedade as a goalkeeper.

Football career
He made his professional debut for Cova da Piedade on 13 September 2020 in the Liga Portugal 2.

References

External links

1997 births
Living people
Portuguese footballers
Association football goalkeepers
Campeonato de Portugal (league) players
Liga Portugal 2 players
C.D. Pinhalnovense players
C.D. Cova da Piedade players
People from Alcochete
Sportspeople from Setúbal District